The flora of Saint Helena, an isolated island in the South Atlantic Ocean, is exceptional in its high level of endemism and the severe threats facing the survival of the flora. In phytogeography, it is in the phytochorion St. Helena and Ascension Region of the African Subkingdom, in the Paleotropical Kingdom.

Endemic and introduced flora
The endemic plants of Saint Helena include many notable Cabbage Tree or, "insular arborescent Asteraceae", members of the daisy family which have evolved a shrubby or tree-like habit on islands. Other notable endemics include the closely related St Helena redwood (Trochetiopsis erythroxylon) and St Helena dwarf ebony (Trochetiopsis ebenus). These are unrelated to the redwood trees of California or to the ebony trees of commerce, being instead in the Mallow family (Malvaceae).

Vegetation
Today there are three major vegetation zones: the tree-fern thicket of the highest parts of the central ridge; the pastures of middle elevations and the dry, eroded "crown wastes" of lower elevations. Of these only the tree-fern thicket is a natural vegetation type. The middle elevations were formerly covered with native woodland of gumwoods (Commidendrum) and other trees, now largely destroyed. The "Crown wastes" or coastal zones were formerly covered with native scrub, of which a major component was probably St Helena dwarf ebony (Trochetiopsis ebenus and St Helena tree ebony Trochetiopsis melanoxylon).

Human impact and conservation
The destruction of the native vegetation began soon after the discovery of the island by the Portuguese in 1502, with the introduction of goats. As there were no native herbivorous mammals, the flora was unadapted to such threats. Later with the establishment of permanent settlement on the island by the English East India Company in 1659, many introduced plants became established which created new vegetation types. Furthermore the native trees were subject to catastrophic cutting for such purposes as housebuilding and to fuel stills for the distillation of arrack. As a result of this legacy many endemic plant species are extinct or critically endangered.

Endemic vascular plants of St Helena
Monocotyledons

Bulbostylis lichtensteiniana (Kunth) C.B. Clarke
Bulbostylis neglecta (Hemsl.) C.B. Clarke
Carex dianae Steud.
Carex praealta Boott
Eragrostis saxatilis Hemsl.

Dicotyledons

Acalypha rubrinervis Cronk
Chenopodium helenense Aellen
Commidendrum robustum (Roxb.) DC. ssp. robustum
Commidendrum robustum (Roxb.) DC. ssp. gummiferum (Roxb.) Cronk
Commidendrum rotundifolium (Roxb.) DC.
Commidendrum rugosum (Aiton) DC.
Commidendrum spurium (G. Forst.) DC.
Euphorbia heleniana Thell. & Stapf
Frankenia portulacifolia (Roxb.) Spreng.
Heliotropium pannifolium Burch. ex Hemsl.
Hydrodea cryptantha (Hook.f.) N.E.Br.
Hypertelis acida (Hook.f.) K. Müll.
Lachanodes arborea (Roxb.) B. Nord.
Lobelia scaevolifolia Roxb.
Melanodendron integrifolium (Roxb.) DC.
Mellissia begoniifolia (Roxb.) Hook.f.
Nesiota elliptica (Roxb.) Hook.f.
Nesohedyotis arborea (Roxb.) Bremek.
Osteospermum sanctae-helenae Norl.
Pelargonium cotyledonis (L.) L'Hér.
Petrobium arboreum (J.R. & G. Forst.) R. Br.
Phylica polifolia (Vahl) Pillans
Pladaroxylon leucadendron ( G. Forst.) Hook.f.
Plantago robusta Roxb.
Sium bracteatum (Roxb.) Cronk
Sium burchellii (Hook.f.) Hemsl.
Suaeda fruticosa Forssk. ex J.F. Gmel.
Trochetiopsis ebenus Cronk
Trochetiopsis erythroxylon (G. Forst.) Marais
Trochetiopsis melanoxylon (Sol. ex Sims) Marais
Trochetiopsis x benjaminii Cronk
Wahlenbergia angustifolia (Roxb.) A.DC.
Wahlenbergia burchellii A.DC. in DC.
Wahlenbergia linifolia (Roxb.) A.DC.
Wahlenbergia roxburghii A.DC.

Pteridophytes (Ferns and fern-allies)

Asplenium compressum Sw.
Asplenium platybasis Kunze ex Mett.
Ceterach haughtoni (Hook.) Cronk
Dicksonia arborescens L'Hér.
Diplazium filamentosum (Roxb.) Cronk
Dryopteris cognata (C. Presl) Kuntze
Dryopteris napoleonis (Bory) Kuntze
Elaphoglossum dimorphum (Hook. & Grev.) Moore
Elaphoglossum nervosum (Bory) H.Christ
Grammitis ebenina (Maxon) Tardieu
Hymenophyllum capillaceum Roxb.
Lycopodium axillare Roxb.
Microstaphyla furcata (L.f.) Fée
Ophioglossum polyphyllum A. Braun
Pseudophegopteris dianae (Hook.) Holttum
Pteris paleacea Roxb.

Endemic genera

Commidendrum
Lachanodes
Melanodendron
Mellissia
Nesiota†
Nesohedyotis
Petrobium
Pladaroxylon
Trochetiopsis

See also
Wildlife of Saint Helena, Ascension and Tristan da Cunha

References

External links 
Plant talk article: The Millennium Forest: evolving and maturing
A potted history of the flora of St Helena and its conservation

Sources

Further reading

Flora of Saint Helena
Biota of Saint Helena
Lists of plants
Saint Helena